Our Country: Americana Act II is an album by English rock musician Ray Davies, released by Legacy Recordings in June 2018. Serving as a follow-up and sequel to Davies' 2017 album Americana, the album is made up of material recorded during the sessions for its predecessor, with American country rock band the Jayhawks once again contributing. As with the previous album, Americana Act II explores the themes relating to Davies' experiences of American culture and of living and touring in the United States.

Track listing

Personnel
Musicians
 Ray Davies – lead vocals, guitars, piano, backing vocals, percussion, harmonica, spoken word, dropped beer glasses and broken tea cups
 Bill Shanley – acoustic guitars, electric guitars, backing vocals
 Gary Louris – acoustic guitars, electric guitars, backing vocals
 Marc Perlman – bass, backing vocals
 Tim O'Reagan – drums, backing vocals, percussion
 Karen Grotberg – piano, keyboards, lead vocals, backing vocals
 John Jackson – mandolin, violin, acoustic guitars, electric guitars, 12-string guitar, backing vocals, percussion

Technical personnel
 Ray Davies – producer, arranger
 Guy Massey – co-producer, recording and mixing
 John Jackson – co-producer
 Josh Green – recording and mixing
 Bob Ludwig – mastering

References

2018 albums
Ray Davies albums
Albums produced by Ray Davies
Legacy Recordings albums
Sequel albums